John Herman Frank Schulte (November 15, 1881 – August 17, 1975) was a shortstop in Major League Baseball. He played for the Boston Beaneaters in 1906.

References

External links

1881 births
1975 deaths
Major League Baseball shortstops
Boston Beaneaters players
Syracuse Stars (minor league baseball) players
Baseball players from Cincinnati
Paterson Invaders players